Conasprella paumotu is a species of sea snail, a marine gastropod mollusk in the family Conidae, the cone snails and their allies.

Description
The length of the shell attains 16 mm.

Distribution
This species occurs in the Pacific Ocean off the Tuamotu archipel.

References

 Rabiller M. & Richard G., 2014. Conus (Gastropoda, Conidae) from offshore French Polynesia: Description of dredging from TARASOC expedition, with new records and new species. Xenophora Taxonomy 5: 26-49
 Monnier E., Limpalaër L., Robin A. & Roux C. (2018). A taxonomic iconography of living Conidae. Harxheim: ConchBooks. 2 vols. 1205 pp.  page(s): 203

External links
 Gastropods.com: Conus paumotu

paumotu
Gastropods described in 2014